Kai-man Kwan (also spelt Kai Man Kwan) is a Chinese Christian philosopher at Hong Kong Baptist University. He is the current Director of the Centre for Sino-Christian Studies.

Education and Career
After graduating as an electrical engineer from the University of Hong Kong in 1983, Kai-man worked as a Science and Maths teacher first at Matteo Ricci College, and then at Carmel Alison Lam Foundation Secondary School. He completed his M.Phil. in 1991 and Ph.D. in 1993 from Oxford University under the supervision of Richard Swinburne. The next year he joined Hong Kong Baptist University as a part-time Lecturer. He served as the Head of the Department of Religion and Philosophy from 2013 to 2018. He was one of the founding members of the Centre for Sino-Christian Studies under the faculty of Arts and Humanities in 2001, where he served as Research Project Coordinator from 2001-2004 and as Associate Director from 2004–2006. He is its current Director.

Kai-man served on the "Academic Council" of the now-defunct, California-based International Children's Rights Institute, an organization founded by Robert Oscar Lopez that unsuccessfully lobbied against gay marriage in the United States, Australia, and Taiwan.

Major Publications
 (2011) The Rainbow of Experiences, Critical Trust, and God: A Defense of Holistic Empiricism', New York: Continuum.
 with Alberto Garcia, eds. (2017) Religious perspectives on Human Rights and Bioethics'', Springer Nature.
Chinese Titles
關啟文，《我信故我思—真理路上的摰誠探索》，香港：基督徒學生福音團契，1998年9月。
關啟文，《「是非」、「曲直」──對人權、同性戀的倫理反思》，香港：宣道出版社，2000年7月。
關啟文，《上帝、世俗社會與道德的基礎》，香港：天道，2006年4月。

See also
Centre for Sino-Christian Studies
Hong Kong Baptist University

References

Kwan, Kai-man
Kwan, Kai-man
Living people
Year of birth missing (living people)
Hong Kong Protestant theologians